Joseph Cassar (born 19 May 1966), best known as Joe Cassar, was a Maltese politician who served as Minister for Health, The Elderly and Community Care. He was a Nationalist Member of Parliament until he resigned on November 1 2015, both from the Nationalist Party and Parliament.

Education
His education was at St. Aloysius College and then at the University of Malta. He graduated as a doctor on 1990. His after specialisation was as a psychiatrist at Yale University (USA) For a number of years he worked as a consultant within the Department of Health. He is also a lecturer at the University of Malta.

Medical doctor
During his professional career, Cassar was President of the Malta Medical Students Association, an executive member within the Medical Association of Malta, the President of Yale Psychiatry Residents Association and an active member of the International Catholic Movement. He has authored numerous papers related to psychiatry.

Political life
He represented the Nationalist Party in the Medical Board for the Maltese Electoral Commission. He contested the 2008 elections in the interest of the Nationalist Party getting elected to the House of Representatives of Malta. Prime Minister Lawrence Gonzi appointed his as Parliamentary Secretary of Health in the Ministry of Social Policy, assisting Minister John Dalli. Following Dalli's resignation from the post of Minister for Social Policy, the portfolios of Health, Elderly and Community Care were assigned a Ministry. Cassar became the Minister for Health, Elderly and Community Care on 9 February 2010. Mario Galea, retained his own position as Parliamentary Secretary for the Elderly and Community Care. 

Joe Cassar retired from politics in 2015.

References
 Official Website
 DOI website

1966 births
Living people
Members of the House of Representatives of Malta
Nationalist Party (Malta) politicians
Place of birth missing (living people)
Maltese psychiatrists
21st-century Maltese physicians 
20th-century Maltese physicians
21st-century Maltese politicians
Government ministers of Malta